Xiaoqiao Railway Station (小桥站) is a railway station on the Qingzang railway. It serves the city of Xining and is located 3 km from Xining Railway Station.

See also
List of stations on Qingzang railway

Buildings and structures in Xining
Railway stations in Qinghai
Stations on the Qinghai–Tibet Railway